The Unbelievable Truth is an Australian comedy television series on the Seven Network, based on a British radio show of the same name. The series is produced by members of The Chaser and Graeme Garden's Random Entertainment, and was first screened in October 2012.

The show is hosted by Craig Reucassel with fellow Chaser members Julian Morrow and Andrew Hansen appearing in alternate episodes. The show features guests spinning lies about a given topic, while slipping in truths which they hope will be undetected by their fellow players.

Guests
 Episode 1: Toby Truslove, Kitty Flanagan and Sam Simmons
 Episode 2: Graeme Garden, Merrick Watts and Sarah Kendall
 Episode 3: Shane Jacobson, Kitty Flanagan and Sam Simmons
 Episode 4: Cal Wilson, Toby Truslove and Scott Dooley
 Episode 5: Scott Dooley, Celia Pacquola and Stephen K. Amos
 Episode 6: Virginia Gay, The Umbilical Brothers and Akmal Saleh
 Episode 7: Tom Gleeson, Scott Dooley and Claudia O'Doherty
 Episode 8: Scott Dooley and Kitty Flanagan
 Episode 9: Tom Gleeson, Virginia Gay and Toby Schmitz
 Episode 10: Jimeoin, Sarah Kendall and The Umbilical Brothers

 Craig Reucassel replaced Andrew Hansen for his speech.
 Third guest was replaced by a member of The Chaser.
 Episode 9 was uploaded to the Seven website on 23 November, a week before the original airdate. The episode was taken down by Seven and replaced by episode 8.

References

External links
Audio interview with Andrew Hansen on the Goodies Podcast

Australian panel games
Seven Network original programming
Australian comedy television series
2012 Australian television series debuts
2012 Australian television series endings
The Chaser
Television series based on radio series
Television game shows with incorrect disambiguation